Seeing Like a State: How Certain Schemes to Improve the Human Condition Have Failed is a book by James C. Scott critical of a system of beliefs he calls high modernism, that centers on overconfidence in the ability to design and operate society in accordance with scientific laws. It was released in March 1998, with a paperback version in February 1999. 

The book catalogues schemes which states impose upon populaces that are convenient for the state since they make societies "legible" but are not necessarily good for the people; census data, standardized weights and measures, and uniform languages make it easier to tax and control the population.

Reception

Book reviews
Stanford University political scientist David D. Laitin described it as "a magisterial book." But he said there were flaws in the methodology of the book, saying the book "is a product of undisciplined history. For one, Scott’s evidence is selective and eclectic, with only minimal attempts to weigh disconfirming evidence... It is all too easy to select confirming evidence if the author can choose from the entire historical record and use material from all countries of the world."

John Gray, author of False Dawn: The Delusions of Global Capitalism, reviewed the book favorably for the New York Times, concluding: "Today's faith in the free market echoes the faith of earlier generations in high modernist schemes that failed at great human cost. Seeing Like a State does not tell us what it is in late modern societies that predisposes them, against all the evidence of history, to put their trust in such utopias. Sadly, no one knows enough to explain that."

Economist Brad DeLong wrote a detailed online review of the book. DeLong's interpretation of the book was critiqued by Henry Farrell on the Crooked Timber blog, and there was a follow-up exchange including further discussion of the book.

Economist Deepak Lal reviewed the book for the Summer 2000 issue of The Independent Review, concluding: "Although I am in sympathy with Scott’s diagnosis of the development disasters he recounts, I conclude that he has not burrowed deep enough to discover a systematic cause of these failures. (In my view, that cause lies in the continuing attraction of various forms of 'enterprises' in what at heart remains Western Christendom.) Nor is he right in so blithely dismissing the relevance of classical liberalism in finding remedies for the ills he eloquently describes."

Political scientist Ulf Zimmermann reviewed the book for H-Net Online in December 1998, concluding: "It is important to keep in mind, as Scott likewise notes, that many of these projects replaced even worse social orders and at least occasionally introduced somewhat more egalitarian principles, never mind improving public health and such. And, in the end, many of the worst were sufficiently resisted in their absurdity, as he had shown so well in his Weapons of the Weak and as best demonstrated by the utter collapse of the soviet system. "Metis" alone is not sufficient; we need to find a way to link it felicitously with—to stick with Scott's Aristotelian vocabulary—phronesis and praxis, or, in more ordinary terms, to produce theories more profoundly grounded in actual practice so that the state may see better in implementing policies."

Michael Adas of Rutgers University reviewed the book for the Summer 2000 issue of the Journal of Social History.

Russell Hardin, a professor of politics at New York University, reviewed the book for The Good Society in 2001, disagreeing with Scott's diagnosis somewhat. Hardin concluded: "The failure of collectivization was therefore a failure of incentives, not a failure to rely on local knowledge."

Discussions
The September 2010 issue of Cato Unbound was devoted to discussing the themes of the book. Scott wrote the lead essay. Other participants were Donald Boudreaux, Timothy B. Lee, and J. Bradford DeLong. A number of people, including Henry Farrell and Tyler Cowen, weighed in on the discussion on their own blogs.

See also
 Panopticism

References

1998 non-fiction books
Books about social history
Modernism